The Cyprus School of Architecture (CYSOA) is private school of architecture located in Lemba near Paphos.  The School is associated and shares a campus with the Cyprus College of Art.

The School was founded in 2017 by Emilio Koutsoftides, grandson of the Cypriot painter Stass Paraskos.

Summer Residencies 
The Cyprus School of Architecture is most well known for its summer residency programme which takes place annually for the last two weeks of August.

References

Universities and colleges in Cyprus